Gara-Yaz State Reserve or Qarayazy State Reserve was established on the area of 48.55 km2 in 1978 for protecting and restoring of riparian woodlands around the Kur. It mainly protects rare and endangered tugai ecological systems, occupying the lands in the mid stream of the Kur. Riparian woodlands includes such types of trees as white poplar, oak, alder-tree and white acacia. Among sharp-clawed animals the most widely spread are wild boar and deer, among birds; pheasant, thrush, dove, etc. 

The area of Gara-Yaz State Reserve was expanded by 48.03 km2 to 96.58 km2 on June 2, 2003.

See also
 Nature of Azerbaijan
 National Parks of Azerbaijan
 State Reserves of Azerbaijan
 State Game Reserves of Azerbaijan

State reserves of Azerbaijan